International Anthem Recording Company is an American record label based in Chicago, Illinois. Formed in 2012 by Scottie McNiece and David Allen, and launched in 2014, the label mostly releases records that have been categorised as jazz, with a particular focus on artists from the Chicago area.

History 
The label formed when McNiece, a drummer originally from Indiana, moved to Chicago and started a live jazz night in a bar in the River North part of the city. He invited David Allen, a recording engineer based in South Illinois, to record the acts. The label's first release was Alternative Moon Cycles, by Chicago Underground trumpeter Rob Mazurek, in December 2014.

British DJ Gilles Peterson named International Anthem as his Label of the Year in 2020. In 2021 two of the label's releases, We’re New Again – A Reimagining by Gil Scott-Heron & Makaya McCraven and Suite for Max Brown by Jeff Parker, were nominated for Libera Awards Best Jazz Record, with the Scott-Heron/McCraven collaboration going on to win.

As well as releasing records independently they have put out co-releases with other labels including Don Giovanni, Nonesuch, and XL Recordings.

Roster 
The following artists have released albums through International Anthem

 Ahleuchatistas
 Anteloper
 Miguel Atwood-Ferguson
 Bambi Kino Duo
 Bottle Tree
 Jaimie Branch
 Jeremiah Chiu 
 Angel Bat Dawid
 Alabaster Deplume
 Dos Santos
 Dezron Douglas
 Ben Lamar Gay
 Tcheser Holmes
 Marta Sofia Honer
 Irreversible Entanglements
 Rob Jacobs
 Emmett Kelly
 KrushLove
 Damon Locks Black Monument Ensemble
 Rob Mazurek
 Nick Mazzarella
 John McCowen
 Makaya McCraven
 Aquiles Navarro
 Carlos Niño
 Jeff Parker
 Resavoir
 Gil Scott-Heron
 Charles Stepney
 Emma-Jean Thackray
 Daniel Villarreal
 Jamire Williams
 Brandee Younger

References 

American record labels
American jazz record labels
Jazz record labels
Companies based in Illinois